Chlororustica is a genus of green algae, in the family Chlorococcaceae. Its sole species is Chlororustica terrestris, synonym Ettlia terrestris, a fresh-water alga which grows on rocks or in soil, and has been identified in the Arctic, Tajikistan, Europe and Jamaica.

References

Sphaeropleales
Sphaeropleales genera
Monotypic algae genera